= Conklin Center for the Blind =

Only facility in the U.S dedicated to training blind adults

Coordinates: 29.208244°N 81.048901°W

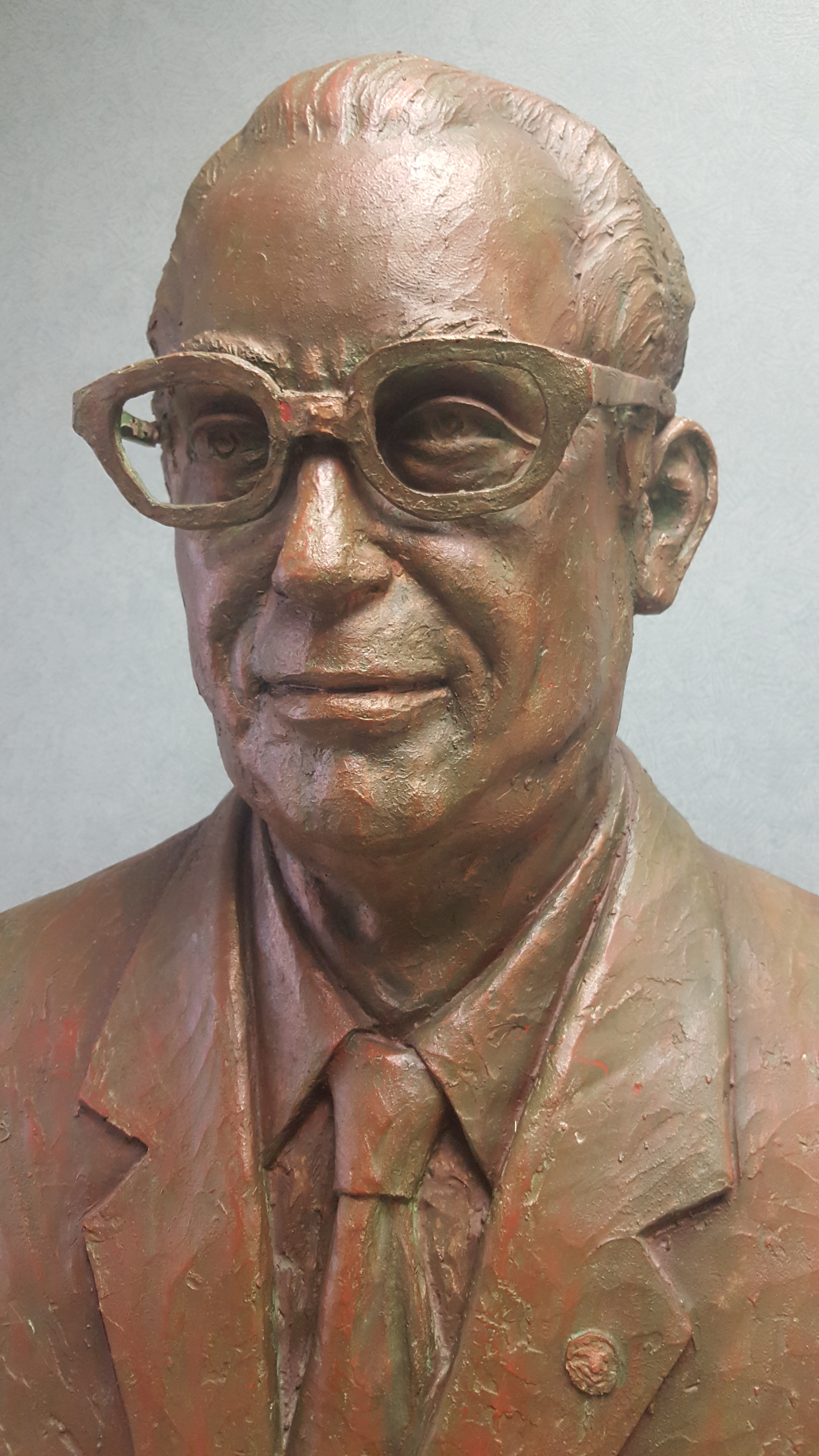
Bust of Millard Conklin, Conklin Center for the Blind, Daytona Beach, Florida

The Conklin Center for the Blind was founded in 1979 by Millard Conklin and the Lions Clubs of Florida. It is the only facility in the United States dedicated to training blind adults with multiple disabilities make a move toward independent living.

Prior to its merger with the Center for the Visually Impaired to form the Conklin Davis Center for the Visually Impaired in October 2020, the Conklin Center for the Blind was located at 405 White Street in Daytona Beach, Florida.
